Faces (subtitled 17 Men and Their Music) is an album by the Kenny Clarke/Francy Boland Big Band featuring performances recorded in Germany in 1968 and released on the MPS label.

Reception

AllMusic awarded the album 3 stars.

Track listing
All compositions by Francy Boland.
 "1st Movement: Vortographs" - 10:31
 "2nd Movement: Solarisation" - 8:12
 "3rd Movement: Panchromatic" - 3:40
 "4th Movement: Macrographic" - 12:37

Personnel 
Kenny Clarke - drums
Francy Boland - piano, arranger
Benny Bailey, Jimmy Deuchar, Duško Gojković, Idrees Sulieman - trumpet
Nat Peck, Åke Persson, Eric van Lier - trombone
Derek Humble - alto saxophone 
Johnny Griffin, Ronnie Scott, Tony Coe - tenor saxophone
Sahib Shihab - baritone saxophone, flute
Jimmy Woode - bass
Kenny Clare - drums
Fats Sadi - vibraphone, percussion

References 

1969 albums
Kenny Clarke/Francy Boland Big Band albums
MPS Records albums